The Fernley & Lassen was a rail line of the Southern Pacific Railroad constructed in 1912–14 between Fernley, Nevada and Westwood, California, near Susanville, a distance of approximately .  The railroad was constructed to connect the Red River Lumber Company's facilities in Westwood with the Southern Pacific's main line running through Fernley.  After the railroad's construction, it was heavily used by other nearby lumber companies; the Fruit Growers Supply Company maintained the longest-lived railroad connection with the Fernley & Lassen, with an active connection present between 1920–1953.  Due to the Great Depression, which significantly lowered freight volume, and the completion of Western Pacific's competing branch to Westwood, however, the Fernley & Lassen's days were numbered.  By 1934, passenger traffic service had been discontinued, with local rail freighting following it in 1956.  In 1978, the Interstate Commerce Commission approved the Southern Pacific's petition for removal.

Route
Coming from Fernley, the Fernley & Lassen roughly follows modern-day Nevada State Route 427 to Wadsworth, then parallels Nevada State Route 447 until the railroad veers westward just south of Nixon.  From there, it briefly parallels Nevada State Route 446 until it merges with Pyramid Highway.  From there, it parallels Pyramid Highway through Sutcliffe and Zenobia, until it veers sharply to the west and starts paralleling High Rock Road.  In Flanigan, the Fernley & Lassen intersects the original Western Pacific Railroad, then continues on to Wendel, California.  From Wendel, it heads due west, passing by the northern coast of Honey Lake, then through Litchfield and Leavitt, until finally reaching Susanville.  From Susanville, the right-of-way continues into the Sierra Nevada range and on to Westwood.  

In Fernley, the Fernley and Lassen Railway Depot has been restored as has the depot in Susanville.  From Susanville to Westwood, the right-of-way, including the grading and original bridges, has been converted into the  Bizz Johnson Trail,  a National Recreation Trail.

Surviving Track
A short section (approximately one mile) of track is still in use, connecting the Nevada Cement plant in Fernley to the Union Pacific line.

Stations
Incomplete list:
 Fernley and Lassen Railway Depot (Fernley, Nevada)
 Wadsworth
 Sutcliffe
 Zenobia
 Flanigan
 Stacy, California
 Wendel
 Litchfield
 Leavitt
 Susanville
 Goumaz
 Lasco
 Westwood

References

External links
Bizz Johnson  Rail Trail  at BLM

Defunct California railroads
Defunct Nevada railroads
Railway lines closed in 1978
Rail trails in California
Southern Pacific Railroad subsidiaries